U.S. Highway 77 (US-77) in Oklahoma is a  U.S. Highway in the U.S. state of Oklahoma. It travels from south to north, paralleling Interstate 35 (I-35), connecting Texas to Kansas through the central part of the state. It travels through many major cities, including Ardmore, Oklahoma City and its suburbs, Guthrie, and Ponca City. It has four lettered spur routes.

US-77 was the first highway in Oklahoma to be paved entirely across the state from state line to state line. It has been a paved roadway since 1930.

Route description
US-77 enters the state along with I-35 but splits off at the first exit in Oklahoma. Four miles later, it passes through Thackerville. It junctions with State Highway 32 on the west side of Marietta.

North of Marietta, US-77 passes to the west of Lake Murray and its state park. It then enters Carter County and Ardmore, where it is named Commerce Street through the city limits over a four-lane divided thoroughfare that includes frontage roads on each side from just south of SH-199 (West Broadway) to NW 12th Street much like a freeway or expressway, though all intersections on Commerce are at-grade.

North of Ardmore, US-77 continues as a four-lane divided highway to Springer. It crosses State Highway 53 south of Springer. North of Springer, US-77 reverts to a two-lane highway and enters the Arbuckle Mountains, providing access to Turner Falls and having some hairpin curves over a section of roadway paved and constructed in the 1920s using prison labor from the Oklahoma State Penitentiary in McAlester. It then passes through Davis (where it has a brief concurrency with State Highway 7. North of Davis, it passes through unincorporated Joy and passes through Wynnewood, where it carries State Highway 29. It then passes through Pauls Valley, Paoli, and Wayne. Next, it enters Purcell, where it concurs with State Highway 39 and 74.

US-77 and SH-39 split off SH-74 to head eastbound along Washington St. in downtown Purcell. Together, they cross the James C. Nance Memorial Bridge into Lexington, where SH-39 splits off. It then heads through Slaughterville and Noble before entering Norman.

A major reconstruction on US-77 through Norman completed in April 2009 has realigned US-77 to 12th Avenue East from SH-9 to Tecumseh Road, then west along Tecumseh Road to Flood Avenue, and finally north along Flood Avenue until it merges onto Northbound Interstate-35, the interchange of US-77 and Interstate-35 was modernized and upgraded as part of the widening to six lanes of Interstate-35 to Norman. It formerly ran through downtown Norman along Classen Boulevard, Porter Avenue then west along Robinson Street to Flood Avenue. The north–south section of the new alignment along 12th Avenue was previously flagged as SH-77H.

I-35 and US-77 remain together until the Fort Smith Junction in downtown Oklahoma City, where it transfers onto Interstate 235. At Interstate 44, I-235 ends, but US-77 continues northbound as a freeway, called the Broadway Extension. The Broadway Extension is a major freeway linking the downtown area to Edmond. In Edmond, it heads east to meet I-35, which it joins again until Guthrie, where it splits off.

In Guthrie, US-77 meets State Highway 33. It continues northbound to serve as the eastern terminus of State Highway 164 and turns eastward toward Perry. After passing the north end of State Highway 86, it turns back northward and has a half-interchange with the Cimarron Turnpike. At Tonkawa, it begins a wrong-way concurrency with U.S. Highway 177 and U.S. Highway 60. It splits off to the north to head through Ponca City and Newkirk, before crossing over the Kansas line towards Arkansas City, Kansas.

History

US-77 has followed Commerce entirely through the Ardmore city limits since 1950 when that thoroughfare was built in its current form as an early bypass along what was then Ardmore's west side to provide a straighter route for through traffic and relieve downtown traffic congestion, replacing the original US-77 route in Ardmore which followed Broadway east from Commerce to "E" Street, north on "E" Street to 12th and west on 12th back to Commerce before proceeding north on Commerce out of the city.

Beginning in the mid-1990s, a massive Capital Improvement Project program was started to widen and reconstruct US-77 between Edmond on the Broadway Extension and the North 36th Street exit on I-235. The project included widening to six or eight lanes, reconfiguring several interchanges, and installing a new BNSF railway bridge over I-235.

The interchange with I-44/SH-66 was reconstructed from a cloverleaf interchange to a four-level interchange that eliminated two cloverleaf ramps. The other two cloverleafs were widened and reconstructed and two new flyover ramps were added. The four-level interchange is the first of its kind in Oklahoma. The $105 million project lasted three years and was opened on March 3, 2022. An additional $16 million is being provided to reconstruct the I-44 to US-77 ramp and provide a direct connection to North Lincoln Boulevard. The project is expected to be started in 2023.

Spurs

SH-153

State Highway 153 (abbreviated SH-153) is a short state highway in Love County, Oklahoma. At , it is the shortest non-suffixed state highway in Oklahoma. SH-153 connects U.S. Highway 77 in Thackerville, Oklahoma to Interstate 35 at mile marker 5. It has no lettered spur routes.

SH-77C

State Highway 77C is an unsigned route through Purcell. It heads east on Main Street, then turns north onto Canadian Avenue. That is the road the eastern terminus of the highway is on, which is at US-77/SH-39.

SH-77D

State Highway 77D is a Y-shaped spur route through the Turner Falls area. The main branch of SH-77D begins at US-77 south of Davis, north of I-35. It crosses under I-35 twice before ending at the Falls Creek Baptist Conference Center. It also provides access to Price Falls.

SH-77H

State Highway 77H begins at Tecumseh Road and follows 12th Avenue N.E. through Norman, then turns into Sooner Road in Moore. The highway ends at I-240 in Oklahoma City.

SH-77S

State Highway 77S lies in Love County and Carter County, serving Lake Murray. The main segment of the highway begins in Love County at SH-32, east of Marietta. It runs north towards Lake Murray then traverses the western shore of the lake. After entering Carter County, it intersects US-70 before reaching its northern terminus in Ardmore.

The highway has two spurs, each one also signed as SH-77S. The eastern spur begins at Love County, near the south shores of Lake Murray. It hugs the eastern shore of the lake while heading north, entering Carter County and reaching its northern terminus at US-70.

The western spur (Lodge Road) runs mostly along the Love–Carter county line, connecting the main SH-77S to I-35 at exit 24, serving as the main entrance to Lake Murray State Park.

Main route

Eastern spur

Western spur

Junction list

See also

 List of U.S. Highways in Oklahoma

References

External links

 Oklahoma
77
Transportation in Love County, Oklahoma
Transportation in Carter County, Oklahoma
Transportation in Murray County, Oklahoma
Transportation in Garvin County, Oklahoma
Transportation in McClain County, Oklahoma
Transportation in Cleveland County, Oklahoma
Transportation in Oklahoma County, Oklahoma
Transportation in Logan County, Oklahoma
Transportation in Payne County, Oklahoma
Transportation in Noble County, Oklahoma
Transportation in Kay County, Oklahoma